The Monument to Moret is an instance of public art in Cádiz, Spain. Designed by Agustín Querol, it consists of a bronze statue of Liberal politician Segismundo Moret (who enjoyed the honorary recognition as "favourite son" of the City of Cádiz) put on top of a pedestal displaying elaborated allegorical reliefs.

History and description 
A noted 19th century politician (later prime minister in the early 20th century), Moret played a key role as Overseas Minister in the abolition of slavery in Puerto Rico in 1870. Funded via popular subscription, the design was awarded to Agustín Querol. The foundation stone was laid in February 1908.

The monument was unveiled on 28 November 1909. It was a relatively rare case of monument inaugurated when the honoured was still alive. Moret reportedly commented that he disliked such kind of tributes in life, adding that had "a feeling that it will cost him some displeasure, for fortune is very fickle for politicians". Yet, in fact, the sculptor, Querol, passed away before Moret, dying just a few days after the inauguration.

The four sides of the monument display inscriptions respectively reading  ("Patriotism"),  ("Freedom"),  ("Loyalty"),  ("Eloquence"). A marble cartouche put on the front side reads  ("Cádiz to Moret").

The back side inscription in the pedestal reads  ("this monument was erected by popular subscription initiated by the Most Excellent Ayuntamiento following a proposal by its Mayor–President, Most Excellent and Most Illustrious Don Cayetano del Toro y Cuartellers. Year 1906").

In 1953, the monument was relocated from its original placement at the plaza de San Juan de Dios (then known as "plaza de Isabel II") to the plaza de Sevilla. In 1960, it was relocated again, this time to the plaza de la Aduana. The monument returned to its original location in 2012.

References 
Citations

Bivbliography
 
 
 

Monuments and memorials in Andalusia
Buildings and structures in Cádiz
Outdoor sculptures in Andalusia
Bronze sculptures in Spain
Statues of politicians
Sculptures of men in Spain